Trebelno pri Palovčah is a small settlement, little more than a group of three dispersed farmsteads, in the hills east of Kamnik in the Upper Carniola region of Slovenia.

Name
The name of the settlement was changed from Trebelno to Trebelno pri Palovčah in 1952.

References

External links

Trebelno pri Palovčah on Geopedia

Populated places in the Municipality of Kamnik